Live, is a live album by American power pop group Big Star recorded in 1974 direct to two-track at Ultrasonic Studios, New York for WLIR and released in 1992. 

The album was reissued in 2019 under the title Live on WLIR, via Omnivore Records.

Track listing
"September Gurls" – 3:12
"Way Out West" – 2:41
"Mod Lang" – 2:38
"Don't Lie to Me" – 3:29
"O My Soul" – 5:31
"Interview" – 2:54
"The Ballad of El Goodo" – 3:54
"Thirteen" – 2:54
"I'm in Love with a Girl" – 2:04
"Motel Blues" – 3:10
"In the Street" – 2:55
"You Get What You Deserve" – 3:29
"Daisy Glaze" – 3:48
"Back of a Car" – 2:30
"She's a Mover" – 3:31

Personnel
Big Star
Alex Chilton – vocals, guitars
John Lightman – bass guitar
Jody Stephens – drums, lead vocals on "Way Out West"

References

1992 live albums
Rykodisc live albums
Big Star live albums